Molguloides is a genus of marine tunicates.

Species
 Molguloides bathybia (Hartmeyer, 1912)
 Molguloides coronatum Monniot, 1978
 Molguloides crenatum Monniot C. & Monniot F., 1974
 Molguloides crinibus Monniot, 1978
 Molguloides cyclocarpa Monniot & Monniot, 1982
 Molguloides glans Monniot, 1978
 Molguloides immunda (Hartmeyer, 1909)
 Molguloides longirecta Monniot & Monniot, 1985
 Molguloides mollis Monniot & Monniot, 1991
 Molguloides monocarpa (Millar, 1959)
 Molguloides sibuetae Monniot, 1997
 Molguloides sphaeroidea (Millar, 1970)
 Molguloides sulcatus Sanamyan & Sanamyan, 1999
 Molguloides tenuis Kott, 1954
 Molguloides tonsus Monniot & Monniot, 1991
 Molguloides translucidus Monniot & Monniot, 1991
 Molguloides vitrea (Sluiter, 1904)

Species names currently considered to be synonyms:
 Molguloides vitreus (Sluiter, 1904): synonym of Molguloides vitrea (Sluiter, 1904)

References

Stolidobranchia
Tunicate genera